Nasir Uddin was a Bangladesh Jamaat-e-Islami politician and the former Member of Parliament of Naogaon-4.

Career
Uddin was elected to parliament from Naogaon-4 as a Bangladesh Jamaat-e-Islami candidate in 1991.

Death
Uddin died on 13 April 2017.

References

Bangladesh Jamaat-e-Islami politicians
2017 deaths
5th Jatiya Sangsad members
Year of birth missing